The National Center for Simulation (NCS) is an association of defense companies, government, academic and industry members. NCS is located in the Central Florida Research Park, adjacent to Naval Support Activity Orlando and the University of Central Florida in Orlando, Florida, USA.

The center is a catalyst for the development, understanding, and advancement of simulation and defense technologies. Its many goals include improving defense readiness, facilitating space exploration, supporting education, and extending knowledge and applications of simulation.

History
NCS was created in 1993 to support collaboration among the defense industry, government, and academia.

NCS is headquartered in the Central Florida Research Park in Orlando, Florida which is home to the world's largest cluster for computer simulation and modeling, including more than 240 modeling, simulation and training companies, the University of Central Florida, and military simulation and training commands for the U.S. Army, the U.S. Navy, the U.S. Air Force and the U.S. Marine Corps.  U.S. Coast Guard interests are handled by a liaison officer and staff embedded in the Navy's training systems organization.

Retired U.S. Air Force Lt. Gen. Tom Baptiste became NCS's president and executive director in January 2010.  Mr. George E. Cheros became President and CEO in July 2019.  Dr, Neal Finkelstein became Chief Operating Officer in October 2019, https://militarysimulation.training/technology/ncs-hires-former-army-research-lab-chief/

Team Orlando
NCS is part of the "Team Orlando" partnership between military organizations, the modeling and simulation industry, and academic institutions working together to leverage resources and contribute to the overall security of the United States.  Besides NCS, charter members of Team Orlando include the U.S. Army's Program Executive Office for Simulation, Training and Instrumentation (PEO-STRI), the U.S. Navy's Naval Air Warfare Center Training Systems Division (NAWCTSD), the U.S. Air Force Agency for Modeling and Simulation (AFAMS), the U.S. Marine Corps Program Manager for Training Systems (PMTRASYS), the Joint Development Integration Facility, the United States Army Simulation and Training Technology Center (STTC), the U.S. Coast Guard Liaison Office at NAWCTSD, and the University of Central Florida's Institute for Simulation and Training.

References

External links
National Center for Simulation’s Official Website

University of Central Florida
Military simulation
American engineering organizations
Defense companies of the United States
1993 establishments in Florida